Oxford Road Halt was a railway station on the Varsity Line  west of the hamlet of Water Eaton, Oxfordshire.

History
At the point where the main Oxford-Banbury road (now the A4165 road) crossed the line, a level crossing was constructed, known as Oxford Road Crossing. This was the location of the temporary Banbury Road terminus, which was used until the facilities at Oxford were ready.

On 1 April 1854 the Buckinghamshire Junction Railway (often known as the Yarnton Loop) was opened, between Oxford Road Junction and Yarnton Junction.

For over fifty years no permanent station had been provided between Oxford and Islip. Two of these halts (including Oxford Road Halt) were opened on 9 October 1905; all three closed on 1 January 1917, reopened 5 May 1919 and the London, Midland and Scottish Railway finally closed them on 25 October 1926.

In 1935 the Oxford Road level crossing was replaced by a bridge to the north-east, which crosses the railway over the site of the former halt.

In 1942 a Government grain silo was built next to the site as part of a Second World War network to concentrate scarce food and distribute it by rail. It was in operation until the late 1980s. In October 2013 Chiltern Railways had it demolished as part of site preparation for the planned Oxford Parkway railway station and car park.

Oxford Road Junction remained; the signalbox was resited slightly to the north-east on 4 November 1956, and on 15 September 1958 was renamed Banbury Road Junction, since there is a junction just north of  also named Oxford Road Junction. It was closed on 29 October 1973.

Oxford Parkway
As part of the operator's Project Evergreen 3, Chiltern Railways opened a new station called  in 2015, on an adjacent site next to the existing Water Eaton Park and Ride site.

Route

Notes

References

 

Disused railway stations in Oxfordshire
Former London and North Western Railway stations
Railway stations in Great Britain opened in 1905
Railway stations in Great Britain closed in 1917
Railway stations in Great Britain opened in 1919
Railway stations in Great Britain closed in 1926